"Perfect Stranger" is a song written by Tim Goodman and John McFee, and recorded by American country music group Southern Pacific.  It was released in November 1985 as the second single from the album Southern Pacific.  The song reached number 18 on the Billboard Hot Country Singles & Tracks chart.

Chart performance

References

1986 singles
1985 songs
Southern Pacific (band) songs
Song recordings produced by Jim Ed Norman
Songs written by John McFee
Songs written by Tim Goodman
Warner Records singles